Andreas Oggesen (born 18 March 1994) is a Danish footballer who plays as a winger for Silkeborg IF.

Club career
Born in Viborg but growing up in Aabenraa, Southern Jutland, Oggesen is a product of the SønderjyskE academy, where he arrived from SUB Sønderborg. In 2011, he was on a tryout at German Bundesliga club Hamburger SV, without this materialising into a move.

He made his professional debut on 20 May 2012 in a 1–1 away draw against Silkeborg IF in the Danish Superliga, coming on as a substitute in the 65th minute for Tommy Bechmann. Oggesen scored his first senior goal in a 0–3 away win over Brøndby IF at Brøndby Stadium, in a match played behind closed doors after a series of pitch invasions by Brøndby's fans had led the Danish Football Association (DBU) to suspend spectators at a number of home games.

Following the expiration of his contract with SønderjyskE in 2016, Oggesen moved to FC Fredericia. On 7 January 2021 it was confirmed, that Oggesen would join fellow league club Silkeborg IF on a three-year deal from the summer 2021.

International career
Oggesen has gained multiple caps for Danish national youth teams, most notably the under-18 and under-19 sides.

References

External links
 
 

1994 births
Living people
Danish men's footballers
SønderjyskE Fodbold players
FC Fredericia players
Silkeborg IF players
Danish Superliga players
Danish 1st Division players
Association football midfielders
People from Viborg Municipality
FC Sønderborg players
Sportspeople from the Central Denmark Region